Stadion Varteks is a football stadium in Varaždin, Croatia, and the home ground of Croatian First Football League (Prva HNL) club NK Varaždin and lower leagues (tiers 3–6) club NK Varteks.

The stadium was built in 1931, as home field for a different NK Varaždin team, which overlapped with the similar-named current tenant until folding in 2015. Stadion Varteks has undergone several renovations since 1931, and currently has an all-seating capacity of 10,800 (as of January 2021, Prva HNL website says 8,818). It consists of three stands, with the main stand being the only one with a roof.

Since 1993, the Croatia national football team and the Croatia national under-21 football team have occasionally (see table below) played against a visiting national team at Stadion Varteks. For some of these games, and for some club-level UEFA competitions, rules against advertising of stadium sponsors has seen the generic name Gradski Stadion ("City Stadium") used.

The stadium is located near the Varteks clothing factory, and also features a Varteks fan shop and a café. From 1958 to 2010, the clothing factory was the main sponsor of the original NK Varaždin team, which changed its name to NK Varteks (no relation to the club founded in 2011) during those 52 seasons. Varteks clothing factory general manager  Anđelko Herjavec (hired 1994 from Levi's Croatia), who by coincidence was born the same year that the club was renamed Varteks, also served as the president of the original NK Varteks, and was a member of the Executive Board of the Croatian Football Federation. After his death in a car accident, in 2001, Stadion Varteks was unofficially renamed Stadion Anđelko Herjavec by fans of NK Varteks; this name still occasionally appears in media coverage.

On 31 May 2017, the stadium hosted the 2017 Croatian Football Cup Final between HNK Rijeka and GNK Dinamo Zagreb.

International matches

The stadium also hosted several international matches of the Croatia national football team as well as the Croatia national under-21 football team.

References

World Stadiums: Croatia

External links

 Frank Jasperneite page

Sport in Varaždin
Football venues in Croatia
NK Varaždin
Sports venues completed in 1931